Henry Archer Edmondson (October 20, 1833 – December 28, 1918) was an American Democratic politician who served as a member of the Virginia Senate and Virginia House of Delegates, representing his native Halifax County.

During the American Civil War, he was a major in the 53rd Virginia Infantry of the Confederate States Army. He was wounded in the Battle of Gettysburg.

References

External links

1833 births
1918 deaths
Democratic Party Virginia state senators
20th-century American politicians
People from Halifax, Virginia
People of Virginia in the American Civil War